Paula Miriam Grossman (October 30, 1919 – September 26, 2003) was an American music educator. When she was dismissed from a teaching position after her sex reassignment surgery in 1971, she sued the school district on the basis of sex discrimination. Her lawsuit, Grossman v. Bernards Township Board of Education, was ultimately unsuccessful, but it garnered national media attention.

Early life 
Grossman was born in Brooklyn, and assigned male at birth, the child of Henry Grossman and Bertha Grossman. Grossman graduated from the University of Newark in 1941, and served in the United States Army during World War II, before earning a master's degree in music education at Teachers College, Columbia University in 1947.

Career 
Grossman was a schoolteacher for over thirty years. She taught music at an elementary school in Bernards Township, New Jersey from 1957 until 1971. After her spring 1971 sex reassignment surgery, she returned to the classroom, and met with her principal and the school board to discuss her continued employment as a woman. The district asked Grossman to relinquish her tenure and transfer to a high school position; she refused those conditions, and she was suspended from her employment before the 1971–1972 academic year. In October 1971, the ACLU agreed to work with Grossman to fight her dismissal. Nonetheless, the state education commissioner ordered her dismissal, and a judge found that the firing did not meet a strict definition of sex discrimination, in Grossman v. Bernards Township Board of Education. The decision was upheld on appeal in 1974. The United States Supreme Court declined to hear the case in 1976. In a later decision, her right to a disability pension was recognized. 

Grossman never taught school again; she performed as a pianist and singer. She lectured on the case and her experiences, and appeared on national television programs covering the controversy of her dismissal, including The David Suskind Show. "I've done nothing wrong, nothing disgraceful," she told Rutgers students at a lecture in 1973. "I had a medical problem and I had it solved. Some people didn't like the solution." By 1977 she was working for the City of Plainfield as an assistant planner. She later wrote an advice book, A Handbook for Transsexuals (1979). She retired in 1980.

One of Grossman's students in New Jersey was Meryl Streep. Another former student, Scott Keeler, wrote a newspaper essay on Grossman in 2007, for the Tampa Bay Times, recalling that "educators and adults in my community, including my own father, let pass the opportunity to teach tolerance and acceptance, and everyone was the worse for it."

Personal life 
In 1949, Grossman married Ruth Keshen, a legal secretary; they had three daughters, and they stayed together until Grossman died in 2003, aged 83 years. Ruth Keshen Grossman died in 2005.

References 

1919 births
2003 deaths
20th-century American women educators
20th-century American educators
Transgender people and military service
American women music educators
People from Plainfield, New Jersey
20th-century American LGBT people
LGBT people from New York (state)
Teachers College, Columbia University alumni
LGBT people from New Jersey
Schoolteachers from New Jersey
Transgender women musicians
People from Brooklyn
American LGBT rights activists
Activists from New Jersey
Discrimination against transgender people